Gibbs is a lunar impact crater that lies near the eastern limb of the Moon. It is situated less than a crater diameter to the northeast of the larger crater Hecataeus. The crater chain Catena Humboldt passes to the south of Gibbs, following a line to the northeast. Due to its proximity to the limb, this crater appears foreshortened when viewed from the Earth, and visibility is subject to libration.

The outer rim of Gibbs is not quite circular, and an outward bulge to the north gives it an onion-like profile. The southeastern wall is slightly straightened and there is a low break in the rim at the southern and northern ends. In other respects, however, the rim is only slightly eroded. The interior floor is nearly level in the southwestern half, with irregular ridges to the northeast. There is a small craterlet to the northwest of the midpoint.

A recent small impact along the northeastern rim has produced a small ray system that forms a skirt of higher albedo material across this part of the rim. Faint traces from these rays cover the interior floor of Gibbs.

Satellite craters 

By convention these features are identified on lunar maps by placing the letter on the side of the crater midpoint that is closest to Gibbs.

See also 
 2937 Gibbs, asteroid

References

 
 
 
 
 
 
 
 
 
 
 
 

Impact craters on the Moon